Pablo Jerónimo Grimaldi y Pallavicini, 1st Duke of Grimaldi, GE (6 July 1710 in Genoa – 1 October 1789) was a Spanish diplomat and politician. After extensive experience as an Ambassador, Grimaldi served as Chief Minister of Spain between 1763 and 1778 helping to rebuild Spanish power following its defeat during the Seven Years' War. For his services as Secretary of State, he was granted the title of Duke of Grimaldi by King Charles III of Spain. Grimaldi was of Genoese descent, and a member of the House of Grimaldi.

Early life
Pablo Jeronimo was born as the younger son of Francesco Maria Grimaldi (d. 1754), Senator of the Republic of Genova and his wife, Maria Giovanna Pallavicini (1679-1741). His brother Raniero Grimaldi also served as the Senator of the Republic of Genoa.

Biography 

In the service of Spanish Kings Ferdinand VI and Charles III, Grimaldi was minister plenipotentiary in Sweden and Parma, and ambassador to the States-General of the United Provinces. Charles III named him ambassador to Paris, where together with French Secretary of State Étienne François, duc de Choiseul he negotiated the third Family Compact between France and Spain. This provoked the entry of Spain into the war with Britain. He also signed the Peace of Paris in 1763.

In September 1763, after the dismissal of Ricardo Wall he was named Spanish Minister of State, a position he held until 1776. He was a reformer, a member of the group known as golillas. Together with the Leopoldo de Gregorio, Marquis of Esquilache he helped suppress the 1766 riots provoked by Esquilache's reforms. (His house was sacked during the rioting.) He was a member of the junta that voted for the suppression of the Jesuits in 1767.

In 1776, after various conflicts, particularly the defeat of the 1775 expedition to Algiers, he was removed from office and made ambassador in Rome. He was made grandee of Spain and decorated with the Order of the Golden Fleece, 1765. He was also granted the title of Duque de Grimaldi, 8 April 1777, by King Charles III of Spain, a.k.a. former King Charles VII of Naples, for his services to the Spanish Crown. The successor in his government positions was also a "golilla", namely, José Moñino, 1st Count of Floridablanca, (Murcia, Spain, 21 October 1728 - Seville, Spain, 30 December 1808).

See also 
 List of French Ambassadors to Great Britain

References

External links

 Vida de Carlos III, by Fernán-Núñez, in the Biblioteca Virtual Miguel de Cervantes.
 A short biography at Encarta (Archived 2009-10-31)
 Brief biography

1720 births
1789 deaths
Dukes of Spain
Knights of the Golden Fleece of Spain
Knights of Malta
Spanish diplomats
Government ministers of Spain
Grandees of Spain
Politicians from Genoa
Ambassadors of Spain to Great Britain